The Agriculture Act 1920 (10 & 11 Geo. V c. 76) was an Act of Parliament in the United Kingdom passed in December 1920 by the Coalition Government.

It was designed to support price guarantees for agricultural products, and to maintain minimum wages for farm labourers. However, it proved ineffective; the guarantees were abandoned in July 1921, with the relevant parts of the Act repealed, and the price of wheat crashed from 84s 7d a quarter to 44s 7d within one year - a drop of 48%.

The Act had established wage committees to fix minimum agricultural pay; these, too, were soon abandoned. A replacement system of "conciliation committees" was set up to mediate between employers and labourers, but these had no legal powers, and the average weekly wage fell from 46s at the beginning of 1921 to 36s by the end of the year, and to 28s a week within eighteen months of the repeal.

The next attempt to fix agricultural wages would be Labour's Agricultural Wages (Regulation) Act 1924.

References
Facts and Figures for Socialists, 1951. Labour Party Research Department, London, 1950

United Kingdom Acts of Parliament 1920
Agriculture legislation in the United Kingdom
Minimum wage law
Agricultural labor
United Kingdom labour law
1920 in labor relations